The 2002-03 Everton F.C. season was Everton's 11th season in the Premier League (known as the Barclaycard Premiership for sponsorship reasons), and their 49th consecutive season in the top division of English football. This meant that they became the first club to play 100 seasons in the top flight.

Season summary
After spending the last few seasons struggling against relegation, Everton, revitalised under David Moyes, spent the season challenging for European qualification, at one stage going ahead of arch-rivals Liverpool, who had finished runners-up the previous season. Everton memorably ended Arsenal's unbeaten run in a match at Goodison Park which saw teenage striker Wayne Rooney score the winner, his debut Premiership goal. Rooney was later nominated for the PFA Young Player of the Year award, but lost to Newcastle United's Jermaine Jenas.

The club had less luck in the FA Cup. They were surprisingly knocked out by Third Division (now League Two) side Shrewsbury Town in the third round.

Final league table

Results

Premier League

FA Cup

League Cup

First-team squad

Left club during season

Reserve squad

Statistics

Appearances and goals

|-
! colspan=14 style=background:#dcdcdc; text-align:center| Goalkeepers

|-
! colspan=14 style=background:#dcdcdc; text-align:center| Defenders

|-
! colspan=14 style=background:#dcdcdc; text-align:center| Midfielders

|-
! colspan=14 style=background:#dcdcdc; text-align:center| Forwards

|-
! colspan=14 style=background:#dcdcdc; text-align:center| Players transferred out during the season

References

Everton F.C. seasons
Ever